Aetna is an unincorporated community in Hickman County, Tennessee. United States. It lies at an elevation of 699 feet (213 m).

History
A post office called Aetna was established in 1886, and closed one year later in 1887. Aetna was named after the Sicilian volcano, Mount Etna.

References

Unincorporated communities in Hickman County, Tennessee
Unincorporated communities in Tennessee